Quelchia is a genus of flowering plants in the family Asteraceae.

 Species
 Quelchia ×grandifolia Maguire, Steyerm. & Wurdack - Venezuela
 Quelchia bracteata Maguire, Steyerm. & Wurdack - Venezuela
 Quelchia cardonae Steyerm. - Venezuela
 Quelchia conferta N.E.Br. - Venezuela, Guyana
 Quelchia eriocaulis Maguire, Steyerm. & Wurdack - Venezuela

References

Asteraceae genera
Flora of South America
Taxa named by N. E. Brown
Stifftioideae